The following are events related to the 2016 Philippine general election in general, as well as events concerning the presidential campaigns of individuals vying for presidency for 2016.

Events

Summary

Presidential campaign

References

Timeline
Philippine general election, 2016 timeline